John of Brunswick-Lüneburg may refer to:

 John, Duke of Brunswick-Lüneburg (1242–1277)
 John I, Duke of Brunswick-Grubenhagen (before 1322–1367) 
 John II, Duke of Brunswick-Grubenhagen (d. 1401), canon in Hildesheim, Einbeck and Mainz, son of Ernest I, Duke of Brunswick-Grubenhagen
 John Frederick, Duke of Brunswick-Lüneburg (1625–1679)